Xanthophyllum neglectum is a tree in the family Polygalaceae. The specific epithet  is from the Latin meaning "neglected", referring to how the species has been long overlooked.

Description
The smooth bark is greyish, greenish brown or dark green. The flowers are white or yellowish, drying pale brownish.

Distribution and habitat
Xanthophyllum neglectum is endemic to Borneo. Its habitat is mixed dipterocarp or lower montane forests from sea-level to  altitude.

References

neglectum
Endemic flora of Borneo
Trees of Borneo
Plants described in 1973